Shenel Drucilla Crooke (born 14 October 1993) is a sprinter from Saint Kitts and Nevis. She competed in the 100 metres at the 2018 Commonwealth Games reaching the semifinals.

International competitions

Personal bests
Outdoor
100 metres – 11.42 (+1.5 m/s, Winston-Salem 2016)
200 metres – 23.73 (+0.2 m/s, Lexington 2017)

Indoor
60 metres – 7.40 (New York 2017)
200 metres – 23.94 (Boston 2017)

References

1993 births
Living people
Saint Kitts and Nevis female sprinters
People from Basseterre
Athletes (track and field) at the 2015 Pan American Games
Athletes (track and field) at the 2019 Pan American Games
Pan American Games competitors for Saint Kitts and Nevis
Athletes (track and field) at the 2018 Commonwealth Games
Commonwealth Games competitors for Saint Kitts and Nevis
Competitors at the 2018 Central American and Caribbean Games
Saint Kitts and Nevis expatriate sportspeople in the United States